Brnjača (1253– 1264) was a Serbian princess, the daughter of King Stefan Uroš I (r. 1243–76) and Queen Helen of Anjou. Her brothers were Stefan Dragutin (r. 1276–82) and Stefan Milutin (r. 1282–1321). 

The oldest depiction of her, when she was ca. 12 years old is in the 1264 fresco of the burial of Queen Anna Dandolo (d. 1258) at the monastery of Sopoćani (the endowment of her father), shown with a low crown, and clothing closed up to the throat, similar to the male clothing, decorated with pearls on piping, although her appearance is anachronistic.  She is depicted on a fresco in the narthex of Visoki Dečani dating to ca. 1345, alongside later Nemanjić members Simeon Uroš and Teodora-Evdokija. She is depicted in the Nemanjić family tree fresco of Visoki Dečani, which dates to ca. 1350 and is one of the most notable examples of the Nemanjić family trees. She was a nun, and did not marry. She was buried at the Gradac Monastery (the endowment of her mother), in a tomb below her mother's sarcophagus.

Her name is variously rendered Brnjača (Брњача), Brnča (Брнча), Brnjča (Брњча), Bereniče (Берениче), Prnjača (Прњача), and Prnča (Прнча). Her name is unusual. D. Kostić wrote on the reading of her name, etymological similarities and possible combinations. He noted similarity with the placename Brnjak, and Slavic male name Prnjak, but was also inclined that it was derived from Veronica. M. Purković said that it perhaps was a diminutive of Bernarde or Bernardine. It was earlier believed that Brnjača was the nickname of her mother (named so due to the main estate of her feudal state, Brnjak).

See also
List of princesses of Serbia

References

Sources
Books
 
 
 
 
 
 
 

Journals
  
 

13th-century Serbian royalty
Medieval Serbian princesses
1250s births
Year of death unknown
Date of death unknown
13th-century Serbian nuns